Carlos Isamitt Alarcón (March 13, 1887 – July 6, 1974) was a Chilean painter and composer.

References

1887 births
1974 deaths
People from Rengo
Chilean male painters
Chilean male composers
19th-century Chilean painters
19th-century Chilean male artists
Chilean male artists
20th-century Chilean painters
Male painters
20th-century male musicians
20th-century Chilean male artists